Higham  is a large village, civil parish and electoral ward in the borough of Gravesham in Kent, England. The village lies just north-west of Strood, in the Medway unitary authority, and south-east of Gravesend. The civil parish had a population of 3,938 at the 2001 Census, increasing slightly to 3,962 at the 2011 Census.

History
The priory dedicated to St. Mary was built on land granted to Mary, daughter of King Stephen. In 1148, the nuns of St Sulphice-la-Foret, Brittany, moved to Higham. Higham priory was also known as Lillechurch. On 6 July 1227, King Henry III confirmed the royal grant to the abbey of St. Mary and St. Sulpice of Lillechurch.

The original parish church, the Church of St Mary, stands to the north of the present village. Now redundant, it is in the care of the Churches Conservation Trust, and is open to visitors on a daily basis. It contains much medieval woodwork and its pulpit is one of the oldest in Kent, dating from the 14th century.

The Higham Village History Group, founded in 1997, is devoted to assembling the history of the village

Parts of Higham
Higham has developed as two parts, the original Saxon village of Higham to the north (now Lower Higham) and a more recent settlement to the south around the main road linking Gravesend to Rochester (Upper Higham), which grew in size and importance during the 1800s.

Village facilities

Services within the village are centred on the two parts of Higham.

Higham (upper) is the larger and is the site of the main parish church of St John's, a post office, a GP's surgery, several pubs, convenience shops, a greengrocer, a fish and chip shop, a Chinese takeaway, a library and an Indian takeaway.

Higham (lower) is smaller. It is the location of the original and now redundant St Mary's Church; originally 4 pubs (all closed) The Sun Inn, The Chequers, The Railway Tavern and the Malt Shovel; a garage and Higham railway station. Until recently there was a Post Office and shop serving this area of the village.

The village primary school (Higham County Primary), village hall (Higham Memorial Hall), park (Higham Recreation Ground), tennis courts and the Knowle Restaurant are approximately halfway between the two parts of the village on School Lane. Until the 1990s the GP surgery serving the village was also based in this area.

Points of interest

The Larkin Memorial
The Larkin Memorial is a needle raised in 1835 to the memory of Charles Larkin (1775–1833), an auctioneer from Rochester who promoted the Parliamentary reforms of 1832 that gave the vote to every householder whose property rental value was more than £10. It is at the highest spot at Higham, but stands almost hidden from sight. By 1860 this unusual concrete monument was in danger of collapse, but was repaired in 1869 after local newspaper reports about its condition. It was renovated again in 1974.

Gad's Hill

Gad's Hill was once notorious as a haunt of robbers. As far back as 1558 there was a ballad entitled The Robbers of Gad's Hill. In William Shakespeare's play  Henry IV, Part 1 Falstaff and his cronies organise a highway robbery at Gad's Hill, but Prince Hal and Poins divest them of their ill-gotten gains.

Gad's Hill Place was once the home of Charles Dickens, who bought it in 1856 for £1,790 and died there in 1870. In its garden once stood a Swiss chalet in which Dickens would compose his works. There are signs at the parish boundaries depicting Dickens' characters.

The chalet is now in the gardens of Eastgate House, a Tudor building of great character in Rochester, while the house itself is a private school, originally for girls, but now mixed.

Higham Marshes
The marshes are an important wetland habitat for many species of wildfowl. There are waymarked walking trails across the marshes.

Communications
 Canal: The Thames and Medway Canal now terminates at Higham. Opened 1824, the canal used to connect the Thames at Gravesend to the Medway at Strood. It lost the second half of its route c. 1847 when the railway took over the Higham and Strood canal tunnel, but continued to operate from Gravesend to Higham until 1934. It is now disused but  there are plans to restore it for leisure use.
Canal Road which runs beside it is used by National Cycle Route 1 (between Gravesend and Medway).
 Railways: Higham railway station is located in Higham (lower), near the entrance to the former canal tunnel. It is served by the North Kent Line. This section of the line was closed throughout 2004, to allow the chalk tunnel to be completely relined after a series of roof falls.
 Roads: The main A226 road between Gravesend and Rochester runs to the south of Higham village.

Other transport issues relating to Higham centre on a proposed new Lower Thames Crossing through Shorne Wood Country Park being reconsidered in 2013 and a new Thames Estuary Airport nearby on the Isle of Grain.

Demographics
At the 2001 UK census, the parish of Higham had 3,471 residents and 1,580 households.

For every 100 females, there were 92.5 males. The age distribution was 5% aged 0–4 years, 13% aged 5–15 years, 8% aged 16–24 years, 24% aged 25–44 years, 31% aged 45–64 years and 19% aged 65 years and over.

Economy
As at the 2001 UK census, 62.3% of Higham residents aged 16–74 were in employment, 2.2% were unemployed and 34.1% were economically inactive. Unemployment was low compared to the national rate of 3.4%. 21% of residents aged 16–74 had a higher education qualification or the equivalent, compared to 20% nationally.

See also
 One track on the towpath, the other over the canal, by Stephen Rayner, Memories page. Medway News, October 2004
 A Mosaic History of Higham by Andrew Rootes, 1974

References

External links

Villages in Kent
Gravesham
Civil parishes in Kent
Populated places on the River Thames